La fuga is a Spanish dystopian prison escape television series created by Nacho Faerna that originally on Telecinco from 11 January to 4 April 2012. It stars María Valverde and Aitor Luna.

Plot 
Set in a not distant figure, under which the governments have restricted liberties, a member of the resistance against the system, Daniel, is imprisoned for life into a high-security prison located on an oil platform. In order to get him out of the prison, his wife Anna becomes a prison officer and develops an extremely risky rescue plan.

Cast

Production and release 
The shooting location reportedly was a 3,000 m2 set in San Sebastián de los Reyes. The first episode premiered on 11 January 2012 on Telecinco. Directed by Antonio Hernández, the series comprised twelve 70-minute long episodes.

Jeansy Aúz authored the score. The series' main theme "Pero si tú no estás", was written and performed by Nena Daconte.

After a "promising" 16.9% share of audience in the first episode (overcoming its Wednesday rival Downton Abbey), the number of viewers deflated gradually down to a minimum of 8.5% in the penultimate episode, averaging a "weak" 11.3%, even after Telecinco's decision to reshuffle the series from Wednesday to Tuesday and then again back to Wednesday.

Telecinco decided not to renew the series for a second season.

The web airing fared better becoming one of the most demanded online contents of Mediaset España's  platform, and, well received abroad at the Cannes' MIPTV (joining the event's "Wit List"), DirecTV purchased its rights for the Americas.

References 

Spanish prison television series
2012 Spanish television series debuts
2012 Spanish television series endings
Telecinco network series
2010s prison television series
Television shows filmed in Spain
Television series set in the future
Spanish-language television shows
2010s Spanish drama television series
Spanish thriller television series
Television series by BocaBoca